Darling of Mine (Swedish: Älskling på vågen) is a 1955 Swedish comedy film directed by Schamyl Bauman and starring Sickan Carlsson, Karl-Arne Holmsten and Erik Berglund. It was shot at the Centrumateljéerna Studios in Stockholm. The film's sets were designed by the art director Arthur Spjuth.

Synopsis
Swedish American Hollywood film star Jack Harris arrives in his Swedish homeland for the first time for a visit. Journalist Ingrid Billberg is determined to find out information from him.

Cast
 Sickan Carlsson as Ingrid Billberg
 Karl-Arne Holmsten as Jack Harris
 Erik Berglund as 	Mr. Mayflower 
 Barbro Hiort af Ornäs as 	Linda Loy
 Jan Molander as Fred Lindberg
 Gösta Cederlund as 	Newspaper Editor
 Sigge Fürst as 	Police Inspector Billberg
 Sten Mattsson as 	Knotan Lindberg
 John Botvid as Fisher Gustavsson
 Karl-Erik Forsgårdh as 	Roland
 Eric Gustafson as 	Police Inspector at Dalarö
 Alf Östlund as 	District Police Superintendent
 Barbro Flodquist as 	Journalist 'Bang'
 Helge Hagerman as 	Detective
 Axel Högel as 	Railway Worker
 Stig Johanson as 	Railway Worker 
 Edvin Adolphson as 	The Author 
 Sten Ardenstam as Journalist at the Garden Party 
 Per-Axel Arosenius as 	Policeman at Dalarö 
 Tor Bergner as 	Journalist at Expressen 
 Curt Ericson as Journalist 
 Albin Erlandzon as 	Fisherman 
 Karl Erik Flens as 	Journalist 
 Gösta Gustafson as Clerk at the Sea Rescue Office 
 John Harryson as 	Policeman at Stockholm Central 
 Gustaf Hiort af Ornäs as 	Journalist at Expressen 
 Sven Holmberg as Journalist 
 Lilavati Häger as 	Indian Woman 
 Amy Jelf as 	Young Woman 
 Ingrid Jellart as The Detective's Little Daughter 
 Gösta Krantz as 	Ingrid's Photographer 
 Torsten Lilliecrona as 	Man at Skansen Reading a Newspaper 
 Arne Lindblad as 	Waiter 
 Sten Lonnert as 	Journalist 
 Gabriel Rosén as 	Policeman at Stockholm Central
 Birger Sahlberg as 	Man in Rescue Boat 
 Georg Skarstedt as 	Man in Rescue Boat 
 Rune Stylander as 	Journalist at Expressen

References

Bibliography 
 Per Olov Qvist & Peter von Bagh. Guide to the Cinema of Sweden and Finland. Greenwood Publishing Group, 2000.

External links 
 

1955 films
1955 comedy films
Swedish comedy films
1950s Swedish-language films
Films directed by Schamyl Bauman
1950s Swedish films